Jefferson High School is an American public high school in Daly City, California, United States, and was the first school in the Jefferson Union High School District (JUHSD). Jefferson serves Daly City, Brisbane, Pacifica, and Colma.

History
Daly City residents who formerly had to send their children to San Francisco high schools because of a lack of a local alternative voted into existence the Jefferson Union High School District in 1922. This resulted in the formation of Jefferson High School.

Campus

Jefferson High School (JHS) opened in 1922 to its first 50 students using the old Jefferson Hall (previously Jefferson Elementary School) near San Pedro Road and Hill Street. Recognizing the need for a more suitable campus to accommodate the rapidly expanding student body, JUHSD residents voted to build a new campus at the current location in 1923.

The first building was finished in 1925. Subsequently, this building was demolished and replaced in 1963.

In 2000, alumnus John Madden donated the lighting for the campus football field. They are named "Madden Lights" in his honor.

In 2005, Jefferson began a project to renovate and remodel the campus.

Demographics

According to U.S. News & World Report, 97% of Jefferson's student body is "of color," with 50% of the student body coming from an economically disadvantaged household, determined by student eligibility for California's Reduced-price meal program.

Academics

Curriculum
Jefferson offers Advanced Placement courses in US History, AP World History, Chemistry, Spanish Language and Culture, US Government, Language and Composition, Literature, Studio Art, and Calculus AB.

Standardized testing

Extracurricular activities

Co-curricular clubs

The following co-curricular clubs are hosted at Jefferson High School to complement the regular school curriculum:

Journalism
The Tom-Tom is Jefferson's student newspaper. It is published quarterly, usually in November, February, April and June.

The newspaper regularly participates in and has received awards in local (Peninsula Press Club), state (Journalism Education Association of Northern California) and national (Journalism Education Association/NSPA) conferences and competitions.

Sports
Jefferson provides the following sports programs depending on the season:
Fall/Winter: football, volleyball, basketball, soccer, cheerleading, cross country running
Spring: badminton, baseball, softball, swimming, track

Notable alumni

 Tony Compagno, former NFL player for the Pittsburgh Steelers
 E. Floyd Kvamme, 1955. Partner, Kleiner Perkins Caufield & Byers. Co-chair, President's Council of Advisors on Science and Technology.
 John Madden, 1954. NFL Hall of Fame coach, player, commentator.
 Don Mossi, 1929, former MLB player with the Cleveland Indians, made the All-Star team in 1957
 Edwin Mulitalo, 1992. NFL player with the Super Bowl XXXV Champion-Baltimore Ravens
 Ken Reitz, 1969, former MLB player who played for the St. Louis Cardinals, San Francisco Giants, Chicago Cubs, and Pittsburgh Pirates from 1972 to 1982

See also
San Mateo County high schools

References

External links
Jefferson High School website
JUHSD website
Alumni website
California Department of Education - DataQuest report for parents

Jefferson Union High School District schools
Educational institutions established in 1922
High schools in San Mateo County, California
Public high schools in California
1922 establishments in California